Nobleville is a town in Saskatchewan, Canada.

Nobleville was a very small town in the 1950s. It had a store, a post office, and a church. The church was rebuilt in the 1980s. Present day, Nobleville is now a small community of neighbours who attend the Roman Catholic Church.

References 

Kelvington No. 366, Saskatchewan
Unincorporated communities in Saskatchewan